My Buddy may refer to:

 My Buddy (TV series), a 2009 Mediacorp drama produced by Matrix Vision
 My Buddy (doll), a doll intended for boys
 My Buddy (album), 1983 album by Rosemary Clooney
 "My Buddy" (song), a 1922 popular song
 "My Buddy" (G-Unit song), from the 2003 album Beg for Mercy
 My Buddy (film), a 1944 American crime film